McLish is a surname. Notable people with the surname include:

Cal McLish (1925–2010), American baseball player
Rachel McLish (born 1955), American bodybuilder

See also
McLeish